John McAdams may refer to:

 John McAdams (announcer) (1941–2005), sports announcer
 John C. McAdams (1945–2021), associate professor of political science at Marquette University
 Johnny McAdams (1912–1975), American basketball player

See also
John McAdam (disambiguation)